The SM-65 Atlas was the first operational intercontinental ballistic missile (ICBM) developed by the United States and the first member of the Atlas rocket family. It was built for the U.S. Air Force by the Convair Division of General Dynamics at an assembly plant located in Kearny Mesa, San Diego. Atlas became operational in October 1959, but was soon made obsolete as an ICBM by new development, and was retired from this role by 1965.

Atlas required long preparation times which made it unsuitable for a quick launch ICBM. However, this was not a requirement for planned space launches, and so Atlas-derived launch vehicles served a long history as space launchers. Even before its ICBM use ended in 1965, Atlas had placed four Project Mercury astronauts in orbit and was becoming the foundation for a family of successful space launch vehicles, most notably Atlas Agena and Atlas Centaur. Mergers led to the acquisition of the Atlas Centaur line by the United Launch Alliance. Today ULA supports the larger Atlas V, which combines the Centaur upper stage with a new booster. Until 1995, many retired Atlas ICBMs were refurbished and combined with upper stages to launch satellites.

History
Atlas was the first US ICBM and one of the first large liquid-fueled rockets. As such, its early development was quite chaotic, with plans changing rapidly as flight tests revealed issues.

Atlas began in 1946 with the award of an Army Air Forces research contract to Convair for the study of a  range missile that might at some future date carry a nuclear warhead. This MX-774 project was named for the Atlas of Greek mythology and the contractor's parent Atlas Corporation.  At the time, the smallest atomic warheads were all larger than the maximum theoretical payloads of the planned long range missiles, so the contract was canceled in 1947, but the Army Air Forces allowed Convair to launch the three almost-completed research vehicles using the remaining contract funds. The three flights were only partially successful, but did show that balloon tanks and gimbaled rocket engines were valid concepts.

A second development contract was awarded to Convair on 23 January 1951 for what was then called MX-1593, with a relatively low priority. The initial design completed by Convair in 1953 was larger than the missile that eventually entered service. This, in addition to the Soviet Union's 1953 Joe 4 dry fuel thermonuclear weapon test and the CIA learning that the Soviet ICBM program was making progress, led to the project being dramatically accelerated. Project Atlas was assigned the highest Air Force development priority on 14 May 1954 by General Thomas D. White.

Atlas development was tightly controlled by the Air Force's Western Development Division, WDD, later part of the Air Force Ballistic Missile Division. Contracts for warhead, guidance and propulsion were handled separately by WDD. The first successful flight of a highly instrumented Atlas missile to full range occurred 28 November 1958. Atlas ICBMs were deployed operationally from 31 October 1959 to 12 April 1965.

The missile was originally designated as the XB-65 experimental bomber; in 1955 it was redesignated SM-65 ("Strategic Missile 65") and, from 1962, it became CGM-16. This letter "C" stood for "coffin" or "Container", the rocket being stored in a semi-hardened container; it was prepared for launch by being raised and fueled in the open. The Atlas-F (HGM-16) was stored vertically underground, but launched after being lifted to the surface.

By 1965, with the second-generation Titan II having reached operational status, the Atlas was obsolete as a missile system and had been phased out of military use. Many of the retired Atlas D, E, and F missiles were used for space launches into the 1990s.

The penetrating lubricant WD-40 found its first use as a corrosion-inhibiting coating for the outer skin of the Atlas missile.

Missile details

The Atlas's complicated, unconventional design proved difficult to debug compared with rocket families such as Thor and Titan which used conventional aircraft-style structures and two stage setups and there were dozens of failed launches during the early years. After watching Atlas Serial 7D explode shortly after its nighttime launch, Mercury astronaut Gus Grissom remarked "Are we really going to get on top of one of those things?" The numerous failures led to Atlas being dubbed an "Inter County Ballistic Missile" by missile technicians, but by 1965 most of the problems had been worked out and it was a reliable launch vehicle. Nearly every component in the Atlas managed to fail at some point during test flights, from the engine combustion chambers to the tank pressurization system to the flight control system, but Convair engineers noted with some pride that there had never been a repeat of the same failure more than three times, and every component malfunction on an Atlas flight was figured out and resolved. The last major design hurdle to overcome was unstable engine thrust, which caused three Atlas missiles (Serial 51D and 48D in 1960 and Serial 27E in 1961) to explode on their launching stands.

Pressure stabilized tanks
Atlas was unusual in its use of balloon tanks for fuel, made of very thin stainless steel with minimal or no rigid support structures.  Pressure in the tanks provides the structural rigidity required for flight.  An Atlas rocket would collapse under its own weight if not kept pressurized, and had to have  nitrogen in the tank even when not fueled. The only other known use of balloon tanks at the time of writing is the ULA Centaur high-energy upper stage, although some rockets (such as the SpaceX Falcon series) use partially pressure-supported tanks. The rocket had two small thrust chambers on the sides of the tank called vernier rockets. These provided fine adjustment of velocity and steering after the sustainer engine shut down.

'Stage-and-a-half'
Atlas was informally classified as a "stage-and-a-half" rocket, with a central sustainer engine and set of two booster engines that were all started at launch, each drawing from a single set of propellant tanks. Most multistage rockets drop both engines and fuel tanks simultaneously before firing the next stage's engines. However, when the Atlas missile was being developed, there was doubt as to whether a rocket engine could be air-started. Therefore, the decision was made to ignite all of the Atlas' engines at launch; the booster engines would be discarded, while the sustainer continued to burn. A stage of a liquid propellant rocket normally consists of both propellant tanks and engines, so jettisoning one or more engines only is equivalent to "half a stage". At staging, the booster engines would be shut off and a series of mechanical and hydraulic mechanisms would close the plumbing lines to them. The booster section would then be released by a series of hydraulic clamps (aside from the early test model Atlas B, which used explosive bolts) and slide off the missile on two tracks. From there on, the sustainer and verniers would operate by themselves. Booster staging took place at roughly two minutes into launch, although the exact timing could vary considerably depending on the model of Atlas as well as the particular mission being flown. This "stage-and-a-half" design was made possible by the extremely light weight balloon tanks. The tanks made up such a small percentage of the total booster weight that the mass penalty of lifting them to orbit was less than the technical and mass penalty required to throw half of them away mid-flight. However, technology advanced quickly and not long after design work on Atlas was completed, Convair rival Martin proposed a solution to the air-starting problem. Their Titan I missile, developed as an Atlas backup, had a conventional two stage design.

Engines
The booster engine consisted of two large thrust chambers. On the Atlas A/B/C, one turbopump assembly powered both booster engines. On the Atlas D, the booster engines had separate pump assemblies. On the Atlas E/F, each booster turbopump also got its own gas generator. Later space launcher variants of the Atlas used the MA-5 propulsion system with twin turbopumps on each booster engine, driven by a common gas generator. The boosters were more powerful than the sustainer engine and did most of the lifting for the first two minutes of flight. In addition to pitch and yaw control, they could also perform roll control in the event of a vernier failure. The sustainer engine on all Atlas variants consisted of a single thrust chamber with its own turbopump and gas generator, which also powered two small pressure-fed vernier engines. The verniers provided roll control and final velocity trim. The total sea level thrust of all five thrust chambers was 360,000 lbf (1,600 kN) for a standard Atlas D. Atlas E/F had 375,000 pounds of thrust. Total sea level thrust for these three-engine Atlas Es and Fs was 389,000 lbf (1,730 kN). Launcher variants of the Atlas often had performance enhancements to the engines.

Guidance
The Atlas missiles A through D used radio guidance: the missile sent information from its inertial system to a ground station by radio, and received course correction information in return. The Atlas E and F had completely autonomous inertial guidance systems.

The ground based guidance computer was a key part of the missile system, until guidance computers were miniaturized enough to be installed inside the missile. Isaac L. Auerbach designed the Burroughs guidance computer for the Atlas ICBM missiles. The Burroughs guidance computer was one of the first transistor computers. It processed 24-bit data using 18-bit instructions. A total of 17 of these ground computers were delivered. These same ground computers was later used for Atlas-Able, Project Mercury, and other early spacecraft.

Warhead
The warhead of the Atlas D was originally the G.E. Mk 2 "heat sink" re-entry vehicle (RV) with a W49 thermonuclear weapon, combined weight  and yield of 1.44 megatons (Mt). The W49 was later placed in a Mk 3 ablative RV, combined weight . The Atlas E and F had an AVCO Mk 4 RV containing a W38 thermonuclear warhead with a yield of 3.75 Mt which was fuzed for either air burst or contact burst. The Mk 4 RV also deployed penetration aids in the form of mylar balloons which replicated the radar signature of the Mk 4 RV. The Atlas missile's warhead was over 100 times more powerful than the bomb dropped over Nagasaki in 1945.

Comparison with R-7
The R-7 Semyorka was the first Soviet ICBM and similarly started all engines before launch to avoid igniting a large liquid fuel engine at high altitudes. However, the R-7 had a central sustainer section, with four boosters attached to its sides. The large side boosters required use of an expensive launch pad and prevented launching the rocket from a silo. Like the Atlas, the use of cryogenic liquid oxygen meant that the missile could not be kept in the state of flight readiness indefinitely and was largely useless for its intended purpose (military) and was similarly developed into a space launch vehicle, initially delivering Sputnik and Vostok into orbit. The Soyuz rocket is descended from the R-7 and remains in use today.

Missile versions

SM-65A Atlas

The Convair X-11/SM-65A Atlas/Atlas A was the first full-scale prototype of the Atlas missile, first flying on 11 June 1957. It was a test model designed to verify the structure and propulsion system, and had no sustainer engine or separable stages. The first three Atlas A launches used an early Rocketdyne engine design with conical thrust chambers and only 135,000 pounds of thrust. By the fourth Atlas test, they were replaced by an improved engine design that had bell-shaped thrust chambers and 150,000 pounds of thrust.

There were eight Atlas A test flights, conducted in 1957–1958, of which four were successful. All were launched from Cape Canaveral Air Force Station, at either Launch Complex 12 or Launch Complex 14.

SM-65B Atlas

The Convair X-12/SM-65B was the second prototype version, introducing the stage and a half system that was a hallmark of the Atlas rocket program. This version was the first American rocket to achieve a flight distance that could be considered intercontinental when it flew .

The Atlas B was first flown on 19 July 1958. Of ten total flights, nine were sub-orbital test flights of the Atlas as an Intercontinental Ballistic Missile, with five successful missions and four failures; the other flight placed the SCORE satellite into orbit. All launches were conducted from Cape Canaveral Air Force Station, at Launch Complexes 11, 13 and 14.

SM-65C Atlas 

The SM-65C Atlas, or Atlas C was the third prototype Atlas version, a more refined model with improved, lighter-weight components. a bigger LOX tank, and a smaller fuel tank. First flown on 24 December 1958, it was the final development version. It was originally planned to be used as the first stage of the Atlas-Able rocket, but following an explosion during a static test on 24 September 1959, this was abandoned in favor of the Atlas D. Six flights were made, all sub-orbital ballistic test flights of the Atlas, with three tests succeeding, and three failing. All launches were conducted from Cape Canaveral Air Force Station, at Launch Complex 12.

SM-65D Atlas 

The SM-65D Atlas, or Atlas D, was the first operational version of the Atlas missile and the basis for all Atlas space launchers, debuting in 1959. It first flew on 14 April 1959.

To provide the United States with an interim or emergency ICBM capability, in September 1959 the Air Force deployed three SM-65D Atlas missiles on open launch pads at Vandenberg AFB, California, under the operational control of the 576th Strategic Missile Squadron, 704th Strategic Missile Wing. Completely exposed to the elements, the three missiles were serviced by a gantry crane. One missile was on operational alert at all times. They remained on alert until 1 May 1964.

SM-65E Atlas 

The SM-65E Atlas, or Atlas-E, was the first 3-engine operational variant of the Atlas missile, the third engine resulting from splitting the two booster thrust chambers into separate engines with independent sets of turbopumps. It first flew on 11 October 1960, and was deployed as an operational ICBM from September 1961 until March 1965.

A major enhancement in the Atlas E was the new all-inertial system that obviated the need for ground control facilities. Since the missiles were no longer tied to a central guidance control facility, the launchers could be dispersed more widely in what was called a 1 × 9 configuration, with one missile silo located at one launch site each for the nine missiles assigned to the squadron.

Atlas-E launches were conducted from Cape Canaveral Air Force Station, at Launch Complexes 11 and 13, and Vandenberg Air Force Base at Vandenberg AFB Operational Silo Test Facility, Vandenberg AFB Launch Complex 576 and Vandenberg AFB Space Launch Complex 3.

SM-65F Atlas 

The SM-65F Atlas, or Atlas-F, was the final operational variant of the Atlas missile. It first flew on 8 August 1961, and was deployed as an operational ICBM between September 1962 and April 1965.

The Atlas F was essentially a quick-firing version of the Atlas E, modified to be stored in a vertical position inside underground concrete and steel silos. It was nearly identical to the E version except for interfaces associated with their different basing modes (underground silo for F) and the fuel management system. When stored, the missile sat atop an elevator. If placed on alert, it was fueled with RP-1 (kerosene) liquid fuel, which could be stored inside the missile for extended periods. If a decision was made to launch, it was fueled with liquid oxygen. Once the liquid oxygen fueling was complete, the elevator raised the missile to the surface for launching.

This method of storage allowed the Atlas F to be launched in about ten minutes, a saving of about five minutes over the Atlas D and Atlas E, both of which were stored horizontally and had to be raised to a vertical position before being fueled.

Atlas-F launches were conducted from Cape Canaveral Air Force Station, at Launch Complexes 11 and 13, and Vandenberg Air Force Base at OSTF-2, Vandenberg AFB Launch Complex 576 and Vandenberg AFB Space Launch Complex 3.

Operational deployment

Strategic Air Command deployed 13 operational Atlas ICBM squadrons between 1959 and 1962. Each of the three missile variants, the Atlas D, E, and F series, were deployed and based in progressively more secure launchers.

Service history
The number of Atlas intercontinental ballistic missiles in service, at the end of each year:

Atlas-D deployment

In September 1959 the first operational Atlas ICBM squadron went on operational alert at F.E. Warren AFB, Wyoming equipped with six SM-65D Atlas missiles based in above-ground launchers.  Three additional Atlas D squadrons, two near F.E. Warren AFB, Wyoming, and one at Offutt AFB, Nebraska, were based in above-ground launchers that provided blast protection against over-pressures of only .
These units were:
 389th Strategic Missile Wing
 Francis E. Warren AFB, Wyoming (2 September 1960 – 1 July 1964)
 564th Strategic Missile Squadron (6 missiles)
 565th Strategic Missile Squadron (9 missiles)

 385th Bombardment (later Strategic Aerospace) Wing
 Offutt AFB, Nebraska (30 March 1961 – 1 October 1964)
 549th Strategic Missile Squadron (9 missiles)

The first site at Warren for the 564th SMS consisted of six launchers grouped together, controlled by two launch operations buildings, and clustered around a central guidance control facility. This was called the 3 × 2 configuration: two launch complexes of three missiles each constituted a squadron.

At the second Warren site for the 565th SMS and at Offutt AFB, Nebraska, for the 549th SMS, the missiles were based in a 3 x 3 configuration: three launchers and one combined guidance control/launch facility constituted a launch complex, and three complexes comprised a squadron. At these later sites the combined guidance and control facility measured  with a partial basement.

Atlas-E deployment
In this arrangement the missile, its support facilities, and the launch operations building were housed in reinforced concrete structures that were buried underground; only the roofs protruded above ground level. These units were:
 92nd Bombardment (later Strategic Aerospace) Wing
 Fairchild Air Force Base, Washington (28 September 1961 – 17 February 1965)
 567th Strategic Missile Squadron, (9 missiles)

 21st Strategic Aerospace Division
 Forbes AFB, Kansas (10 October 1961 – 4 January 1965)
 548th Strategic Missile Squadron, (9 missiles)

 389th Strategic Missile Wing
 Francis E. Warren AFB, Wyoming (20 November 1961 – 4 January 1965)
 566th Strategic Missile Squadron (9 missiles)

Atlas-F deployment
The six SM-65F Atlas squadrons were the first ICBMs to be stored vertically in underground silos. These units were:

 310th Bombardment (later Strategic Aerospace) Wing
 Schilling AFB, Kansas (9 September 1962 – 1 February 1965)
 550th Strategic Missile Squadron (12 missiles)

 98th Strategic Aerospace Wing
 Lincoln AFB, Nebraska (15 September 1962 – 10 March 1965)
 551st Strategic Missile Squadron (12 missiles)

 11th Bombardment (later Strategic Aerospace) Wing
 Altus AFB, Oklahoma (9 October 1962 – 30 December 1964)
 577th Strategic Missile Squadron (12 missiles)

 96th Bombardment (later Strategic Aerospace) Wing
 Dyess AFB, Texas (15 November 1962 – 1 December 1964)
 578th Strategic Missile Squadron (12 missiles)

 6th Bombardment (later Strategic Aerospace) Wing
 Walker AFB, New Mexico (30 November 1962 – 5 January 1965)
 579th Strategic Missile Squadron (12 missiles)

 820th Air (later Strategic Aerospace) Division
 Plattsburgh AFB, New York (20 December 1962 – 12 March 1965)
 556th Strategic Missile Squadron (12 missiles)

Retirement as an ICBM
After the solid-fuel LGM-30 Minuteman had become operational in early 1963, the Atlas became rapidly obsolete. By October 1964, all Atlas D missiles had been phased out, followed by the Atlas E/F in April 1965. About 350 Atlas ICBMs of all versions were built, with a peak deployment level of 129 (30 D, 27 E, 72 F). Despite its relatively short life span, Atlas served as the proving ground for many new missile technologies. Perhaps more importantly, its development spawned the organization, policies, and procedures that paved the way for all of the later ICBM programs.

After its retirement from operational ICBM service in 1965, the ICBMs were refurbished and used for close to forty years as space launch vehicle boosters.

Atlas-A to -C launch history

SM-65A (Atlas A) variant launch history

Eight flights of Atlas A occurred during the history of this variant.

SM-65B (Atlas B) variant launch history
Ten flights of Atlas B occurred during the history of this variant.

SM-65C (Atlas C) variant launch history
Six flights of Atlas C occurred during the history of this variant.

Survivors
 HGM-16F Atlas is on display at the National Museum of the United States Air Force in Dayton, Ohio. For years the missile was displayed outside the museum. In 1998 it was removed from display. It was restored by the museum's restoration staff and returned to display in the museum's new Missile Silo Gallery in 2007. The stage is currently in storage at the museum. The white nose cone atop the museum's Atlas is an AVCO IV re-entry vehicle built to contain a nuclear warhead. This nose cone actually stood alert in defense of the United States, as it was initially installed on an Atlas on 2 October 1962 at a Denton Valley launch site near Clyde, Texas.
 Atlas 8A is displayed in front of the Strategic Air Command & Aerospace Museum in Ashland, Nebraska; reconfigured as an Atlas D.
 Atlas 2E is on display in front of the San Diego Air & Space Museum at Gillespie Field, El Cajon, California.
 Atlas 2D mounted with a Mercury capsule is on display in the Rocket Garden at the Kennedy Space Center Visitor Complex, Merritt Island, Florida.
 Atlas 10F is on display at the U.S. Space & Rocket Center in Huntsville, Alabama.

Former survivor:
 Atlas 5A (56–6742) was formerly on display on the lawn in front of the Canada Science and Technology Museum in Ottawa, Ontario, Canada, but was removed in February 2015 and dismantled.

Gallery

See also

References

Further reading
 Gunston, Bill (1979). Illustrated Encyclopedia of the World's Rockets & Missiles. London: Salamander Books. .
 Walker, Chuck, & Powell, Joel (2005). Atlas The Ultimate Weapon. Burlington, Ontario, Canada: Apogee Books. .

External links

 
 Karel Jan Bossart, Ir.
 Atlas launch vehicle profile
 Atlas D from Encyclopedia Astronautica
 Atlas ICBM Information/History
 Video of an early Atlas launch in 1960
 1958 Video of "Atlas in Orbit" Newsreel
 Atlas ICBM Launch on 5/23/1960 Video
 556th Missile Sites
 Atlas D Booster Package Jettison (BPJ) Test Footage

1958 in spaceflight
1960 in spaceflight
1961 in spaceflight
1963 in spaceflight
1965 in spaceflight
1966 in spaceflight
1971 in spaceflight
1972 in spaceflight
1973 in spaceflight
Cold War nuclear missiles of the United States
Intercontinental ballistic missiles of the United States
Atlas (rocket family)
Single-stage-to-orbit
Military equipment introduced in the 1950s